Putative Serine Protease 56 (PRSS56) is a serine protease that in humans is encoded by the PRSS56 gene. This protein has been implicated in human eye development.

Genomics

The gene is located on long arm of chromosome 2 (2q37.1). The encoded protein is 603 amino acid residues in length with a predicted molecular weight of 64 597 Daltons.

The protein contains a peptidase S1 domain and possesses trypsin like serine protease activity.

Clinical

Mutations in this gene are a cause of autosomal recessive posterior microphthalmos. The clinical features of this condition include extreme hyperopia due to short axial length with essentially normal anterior segment, steep corneal curvatures, shallow anterior chamber, thick lenses and thickened scleral walls. The palpebral fissures appear narrow because of relatively deep set eyes. Visual acuity is mildly to moderately reduced, and anisometropic or strabismic amblyopia is common. The fundus of the eye shows crowded optical discs, tortuous vessels and an abnormal foveal avascular zone.

Disease Model
Mice homozygous for an ENU induced mutation show increased intraocular pressure, reduction in eye axial length, and narrow iridocorneal angles. Eyes from individuals with angle-closure glaucoma (ACG) often have a modestly decreased axial length, shallow anterior chamber and relatively large lens, features that predispose to angle closure. Homozygous mice model ACG.

References 

Genes on human chromosome 2